Cash-for-summit is the name of a political scandal that broke in South Korea in February 2003 and revolved around the secret payment by the Kim Dae-jung administration to North Korea of 500,000,000 dollars to secure the landmark June 2000 NorthSouth summit between the two Koreas.

The payment, worth 500,000,000 dollars, was criticized by right wing groups of South Korea in particular. Some of them claimed that Kim Dae-jung had "bought" his 2000 Nobel Peace Prize that he received following the diplomatically successful summit. According to scholar Andrei Lankov, these accusations have a "kernel of truth", since Kim was known for never missing an opportunity to promote his lifelong political career.

Hyundai claimed the money was a payment for exclusive business rights in electric power facilities, communication lines, an industrial park, cross-border roads and railway lines in North Korea. It transferred $500 million to the North just months before the summit, triggering criticism that the South Korean Government paid for the summit. Following this, Park Jie-won, the chief presidential secretary, was charged with violating domestic laws on foreign exchange trade and inter-Korean cooperation affairs while orchestrating covert money transfers by Hyundai to North Korea. Park played a pivotal role in arranging the first Inter-Korean summit between South and North Korean leader in June 2000. In May 2006, he was sentenced to three years in prison. Park was released in February 2007, and subsequently pardoned in December 2007.

Kim Dae-jung had been nominated for the Nobel Peace Prize every year from 1987 to 2000. His nominations were in recognition of his work towards the Inter-Korean summit, and his lifelong commitment to democracy. The Nobel Committee decided to award the 2000 Nobel Peace Prize to Kim for his work to preserve democracy and human rights in formerly authoritarian South Korea and East Asia, and for his efforts to establish peace and reconciliation with North Korea and Japan. Additionally, his diplomatic activities in campaigning against repression in East Timor in 1999 were considered.

See also 

Chaebol
Division of Korea
Workers' Party of Korea
Korean reunification
Political corruption
Uri Party

References

External links
"South Korean leader says move was meant to aid 'sunshine' policy", The International Herald Tribune, January 31, 2003.
Claim Bolstered That N. Korea Took Summit Bribe
South Korea convicts six over summit
Roh rejects extension of probe on cash-for-summit scandal
Key figures in cash-for-summit scandal receive suspended terms

Political scandals
Politics of North Korea
Politics of South Korea
North Korea–South Korea relations